Dragon was an experimental high temperature gas-cooled reactor at Winfrith in Dorset, England, operated by the United Kingdom Atomic Energy Authority. Its purpose was to test fuel and materials for the European High Temperature Reactor programme, and it was built and managed as an Organisation for Economic Co-operation and Development/Nuclear Energy Agency international project. It operated from 1965 to 1976.

Many designs of the 1960s and 70s were based on this general tristructural-isotropic (TRISO) fuel concept, including "prismatic" designs with fixed fuel layouts like Dragon, and the pebble-bed reactor designs being developed in Germany. , these concepts have been used in several further research reactors, including  Peach Bottom,  AVR,  HTTR, and HTR-10 as well as for commercial reactors  Fort St. Vrain and THTR-300. The HTR-PM in China is under construction, with one unit at Shidao Bay connected to the grid as of December 2021. Of the nine experimental reactors at Winfrith, only the Dragon Reactor and the Steam Generating Heavy Water Reactor remain, and they are in the process of being decommissioned. During decommissioning, the reactor vessels will be placed in reactor safestores, other structures will be dismantled and stored, any remaining waste will be sent to allocated storage sites, and the soil will be removed as necessary to a suitable Low Level Waste Repository. Finally, the site will be declassified as a nuclear licensed site, landscaped and returned to normal use. The contract for decommissioning the site has been awarded to Costain Nuclear, and the final decommissioning phase has been deferred for twenty years.

The reactor
The Atomic Energy Establishment at Winfrith was built for the construction and operation of experimental and research nuclear reactors. DRAGON used helium gas as the coolant and graphite as the neutron moderator. Fuel was formed into tiny spherical pellets and then coated with ceramics. These were then mixed with the graphite and pressed together to form blocks of various shapes and sizes. Criticality is only possible when the blocks are placed together in certain configurations within a neutron reflector, allowing additional fuel to be held in a ready area and loaded on-the-fly. Helium was used due to its low nuclear cross section which led to higher neutron economy, as well as its chemical inertness allowing it to operate at higher temperatures without fear of eroding the reactor materials. Higher temperatures also allow for more efficient steam turbine operation and make it more suitable for direct use as process heat. In the case of a power failure, natural convection of the helium provided emergency cooling. The fuel used in the reactor was coated particles, consisting of micro-pellets of a fissile material (such as U235) surrounded by a ceramic outer layer. Initially most of the fuel was highly enriched uranium (about 93% uranium-235), though later more lower enrichment (about 20%) fuel was used. The reactor resembled an enormous bottle, with the larger area at the bottom containing the active fuel within the reflector, and the smaller area on top holding additional fuel elements for reloading.

References

Bibliography
 

Defunct nuclear reactors
Former nuclear research institutes
Nuclear research institutes in the United Kingdom
Nuclear research reactors
Nuclear technology in the United Kingdom
Science and technology in Dorset
1965 establishments in England
1976 disestablishments in England